The Federal Medical Centre (FMC) Abeokuta came into existence on 21 April, 1983, when the state hospital, Idi-Aba, was handed over to the federal government by the then state Governor, Chief Olusegun Osoba for development into a federal tertiary health institution for the people of Ogun State and Nigerians in general.

The pioneer Medical Director, Professor E. O. Otolorin meticulously steered the ship of the hospital between 1993 and 1999. He was succeeded by Dr. T. O. Motayo who administered the hospital between 2000 and 2008. He was succeeded by Dr. O. S. Sotiloye who steered the affairs of hospital till 2017. He has since been succeeded by Prof A.A.Musa, who has already spent 4 years in office.

Related pages
Federal Medical Center, Azare

References 

Hospitals in Nigeria
Buildings and structures in Abeokuta